Parmakkurdu is a village in the Akdeniz district of Mersin Province, Turkey, which itself is a part of Greater Mersin. The population of the village was 1,184 as of 2012.

References

Villages in Akdeniz District